Osama Eid Hajjaj is a Jordanian cartoonist, born in Amman in 1973.

Life and career
Osman Hajjaj was born in Amman, Jordan in 1973. He has worked for various daily newspapers in Jordan, such as Ad-Dustour and Al Ra'i, and weekly newspapers such as Al-Bilad and Al-Mar'aa; he worked for Al-Ittihad, the Emirati newspaper. Currently, he works in Al Arab Al Yawm (newspaper) and publishes his cartoons in several regional and international web-sites, such as Cagle Cartoons. and http://www.cartoonmovement.com/.

Osama is the brother of Emad Hajjaj, who is also a cartoonist. The brothers are acutely aware of the challenges involved in publishing political cartoons in the Middle East. Both have been victims of intimidation, have received death threats on account of their satirical work, especially cartoons directed at ISIS.  Osama claims that he was jailed for one of his cartoons.

Work
He is best known for his political cartoons and caricatures, many of which have appeared in texts and monographs  and in popular magazines such as France's Charlie Hebdo.

See also
 Jordanian art
 Omaya Joha

References

Jordanian artists
1973 births
Living people
Jordanian painters
Palestinian painters
People from Ramallah
Jordanian people of Palestinian descent
Jordanian caricaturists
Palestinian caricaturists